State Route 80 (SR 80) is a roughly arc-shaped highway lying in southeastern Arizona that, with New Mexico's State Road 80, is a relic of the old U.S. Route 80, now truncated from San Diego to Dallas. This segment of old US 80 was not closely paralleled by Interstate 10, which lies to its north and instead supplants the old and more direct (defunct in eastern Arizona) State Route 86.

Route description

The route begins at an intersection with SR 10 Bus. in Benson near an Amtrak station. The route heads south until it exits the city limit of Benson, where it turns slightly southeast. SR 80 turns eastward, entering St. David as Patton Street. In St. David, SR 80 turns south as Lee Street. SR 80 steers southeast into desert terrain, (south section San Pedro Valley), intersecting SR 82 just north of Tombstone, where SR 80 becomes Fremont Street. The road intersects SR 90 heading south. In Bisbee, (southern Mule Mountains), the road meets SR 92 at a traffic circle. SR 80 nears the international boundary with Mexico as it nears Douglas. A short concurrency begins where U.S. Route 191 turns eastward heading into Douglas. SR 80 turns north on Pan American Avenue away from US 191. The route then takes a more northeasterly route away from the international boundary. SR 80 heads through a long stretch of desert terrain, (San Bernardino Valley), before meeting New Mexico State Road 80 at the New Mexico state line. All of it is surface road, and it is the route of the Butterfield Stage Coach of the nineteenth century, and the Old Spanish Trail.

It is not a very direct route; west of Douglas it is almost as much a north–south route as an east–west route, and it is practically a north–south route east of Douglas.

History

SR 80 was originally conceived as part of the proposed state system of highway in 1919.  In 1926, it became part of the cross-country highway US 80.  The road was paved at this time between Douglas and Bisbee as well as a portion south of Tombstone.  The remainder of the highway was a gravel road.  By 1931, the highway was paved from Bisbee to the New Mexico state line as well as a portion south of Benson and another portion south of Tombstone.  By 1934, the only portion of the highway yet to be paved was a section between Tombstone and Bisbee.  The entire route had been paved by 1935.  The highway would continue to serve as a portion of US 80 until 1989 when the last portion of US 80 in Arizona was removed.  This portion of the highway was redesignated as SR 80 at this time. On September 21, 2018, most of SR 80 was designated as the Benson to New Mexico segment of Historic U.S. Route 80. The designation was further applied to parts of Allen Street and 6th Street in Tombstone along with Old Divide Road/Tombstone Canyon Road as well as Main Street in Bisbee and G Avenue, 10th Street and A Avenue in Douglas. These other roads were also designated as part of US 80 in previous years, but were bypassed before SR 80 was designated. The I-10 Business Loop in Benson was also designated as part of the Historic Route, as the loop between I-10 and SR 80 was part of US 80 before 1989.

Junction list

See also

References

External links

 

080
1080
Transportation in Cochise County, Arizona
U.S. Route 80
Douglas, Arizona